Saint-Chamond Basket is a professional basketball club based in Saint-Chamond, France. The team currently plays in the Pro B, the second highest professional division in France. The team plays its home games at the Halle André Boulloche, which has a capacity of 1,300 people.

Players

 Omar Abada
 Juwan Staten

References

External links
Official website (in French)

Basketball teams in France
Basketball teams established in 1973